Jules-Henry de Tully (1 May 1798 – 12 July 1846) was a French librettist and playwright.

Life 
A deputy Commissioner of the king at the Monnaie de Paris, a member of the Société Lyrique, an administrator of the Théâtre du Luxembourg, he was co-founder of the Théâtre Beaumarchais (1835) with Théodore Ferdinand Vallou de Villeneuve.

His theatre plays, often signed with the collective pseudonym Charles Henri were presented on the most famous Parisian stages of the 19th century, including the Théâtre du Palais-Royal, the Théâtre de la Porte Saint-Antoine, and the Théâtre du Vaudeville.

An editor at La Psyché, he also authored several songs.

Works 
1822: Les Dames Martin, ou le Mari, la femme et la veuve, comédie en vaudevilles in 1 act, with Gabriel-Alexandre Belle
1825: L'Exilé, vaudeville in 2 acts, after Old Mortality by Walter Scott, with Théodore Anne and Achille d'Artois
1827: Le Mari par intérim, comédie en vaudevilles in 1 act, with Fulgence de Bury and Charles Nombret Saint-Laurent
1827: L'Orpheline et l'héritière, comédie en vaudevilles en 2 acts, with Théodore Anne
1828: M. Rossignol, ou le Prétendu de province, folie-vaudeville en 1 act, with Félix-Auguste Duvert
1829: L'humoriste, vaudeville in 1 act, with Fulgence de Bury and Charles Dupeuty
1831: Le Fils du colonel, drama in 1 act, mingled with couplets
1831: La Plus belle nuit de la vie, comédie en vaudeville in 1 act, with Desvergers and Charles Varin
1833: Le Singe et l'adjoint, folie-vaudeville in 1 act, with Duvert
1836: L'Amour et l'homoeopathie, vaudeville in 2 acts, with Adolphe Jadin and Alphonse Salin
1837: Le Chemin de fer de Saint-Germain, A-propos-vaudeville in 1 act, with Jean Pierre Charles Perrot de Renneville
1837: Zizine, ou l'École de déclamation, vaudeville in 1 act
1939: Le Plus court chemin, comedy in 1 act, mingled with couplets
1840: Misère et génie, drama in 1 act, with A. Desroziers
1841: La Mère et l'enfant se portent bien, comédie en vaudevilles in 1 act, with Alfred Desroziers and Dumanoir
1844: Les fils de télémaque, vaudeville in 1 act, with Jautard
1848: Les Fils de Télémaque, vaudeville in 1 act, with Armand-Numa Jautard
1867: Qu'est c'que ça me fait, ou tout est pour le mieux, comédie en vaudevilles in 1 act, (posthumous)

Bibliography 
 Joseph-Marie Quérard, Félix Bourquelot, Charles Louandre, La littérature française contemporaine. XIXe siècle, 1857, p. 506-507
 Philippe Chauveau, Les théâtres parisiens disparus: 1402-1986, 1999, p. 101, 367

References 

French librettists
19th-century French dramatists and playwrights
Writers from Paris
1798 births
1846 deaths